The Atos Worldline FASTticket system is a passenger-operated, self-service railway ticket issuing system, developed by the Guildford-based company Shere Ltd and first introduced on a trial basis in Britain in 1996, shortly after privatisation.  It has been developed and upgraded consistently since then, and is now used by seven 
Train Operating Companies (TOCs) as their primary self-service ticket issuing system. Other TOCs have FASTticket machines at some of their stations, sometimes supplementing other systems.

History and origins
In the last years of British Rail, before privatisation, the main passenger-operated ticket issuing system (POTIS) on the network was the "Quickfare" B8050, developed in the late 1980s by Swiss company Ascom Autelca. These machines were geared towards high-volume, low-value transactions: they only accepted cash, offered a small and mostly unchanging range of destinations, and were a minor evolution from similar earlier machines whose computer technology was based in the early 1980s.  Quickfares were widespread, especially in the erstwhile Network SouthEast area, but their limitations were increasing as technology became more sophisticated.

Shere Ltd, founded in its present form in 1992, initially specialised in self-service ticket sales/collection and check-in systems for airlines (notably the former British Midland and KLM UK). In the first instance, the FASTticket system was developed directly from these, with early FASTticket terminals resembling their airport equivalents in many respects. Only a small range of tickets were available, for example - mostly higher-value tickets to important destinations such as London; only debit and credit cards were accepted; touch-screen functionality was offered, but there were limited options and sub-menus; and some of the early machines only printed ATB-style tickets (Automated Ticket and Boarding Pass - an international standard format used by airlines, coaches, railways, ferries and other transport undertakings), which are large and inconvenient for passengers to carry, in comparison with standard credit-card-sized tickets.

As more TOCs showed an interest in the system, the hardware and software were developed further, and machines were universally provided with printers able to vend credit-card-sized tickets (although receipts, card sales vouchers and seat reservations were sometimes still printed by a separate printer within the same machine, on glossy flexible paper cut from a roll - batch reference RSP 3598/3: Example).

Before the now standard "Common Stock" layout and format was devised in 2003, credit-card-sized travel tickets were printed on either RSP 3598 or RSP 7599/SCT orange-banded, round-cornered, hopper-fed ticket stock with pre-printed headings.  From September 2003, machines began to be converted to the Common Stock format, (printed by the Newbury Data ND4020 ticket printer) with the standard RSP 9599 stock (with no pre-printed headings) being used.  The first machine to be converted in this way was at Didcot Parkway. Newly installed machines used the Common Stock format as from 2004, and almost all machines have now been converted to do so (as of 2006).

Trial machines
Various TOCs installed machines on trial, including the following (TOC names shown in the table are those current at the time of installation):

Installations
The following table shows the locations and dates of installations as of September 2006.

Silverlink: In the autumn of 2007, Shere Fasticket machines were installed at stations on the Barking & Gospel Oak line. These offer a typical National Rail ticket selection, with no hint that Oyster card PAYG would be valid on the line from 11 November 2007 when London Overground take it over. At the time of writing (October 2007) the home screen suggests that prepaid (i.e. TOD) tickets can be printed on these machines, though the on screen buttons to do so aren't presented. The machines are able to take cash, but are (at the time of writing) payment card only, pending cash collection (i.e. emptying) arrangements being put in place. Oyster card validators have been installed at B&GO (including on platforms) ready for 11 November, and the ticket machines have a circular blanking plate, perhaps for an Oyster reader/writer.

Features

Some machines, chiefly on the former "Intercity" networks (Virgin Trains, First Great Western, East Coast, East Midlands Trains and Gatwick Express), offer "Ticket On Departure" (TOD) pick-up facilities for tickets purchased online or by phone. If this option is chosen at the time of booking, an eight-character code is supplied to the person booking the ticket, who can then use a TOD-enabled machine to obtain the tickets at any time. The process is:
The payment card used to make the booking is inserted in the machine's card slot (it is not charged at this point, as this will already have happened)
An alphanumeric keypad appears on the touch-screen
The code is keyed in. (At least on some machines, such as those at Barking station, if only one ticket order is in hand, the ticket is printed immediately after the payment card is inserted without the need for the code to be entered.)
Many machines offer Seven Day Season Tickets.  Southern originally planned for monthly Season Tickets to be renewed (although not bought for the first time) through their machines, and the information panels mounted on each machine mention this; however, this function is not yet available, and on most machines the wording "monthly seasons" has been blanked out.
Some TOCs machines, notably those on the Southern network, allow tickets to be bought for the next day.  This option is only available after 4.00pm, at which point two buttons appear on the main menu screen: one for "travel today", the other for "travel tomorrow".
Southern uses the name QUICKticket for its machines, both in publicity material and on the machines themselves, as shown on the Hassocks example above.

Until early 2007, a notable feature of these machines was their frequent printer self-test routine, which resulted in the production of two test tickets (one from the main ticket printer, one from the receipt and card sales voucher printer) showing all of the printable characters.  These were also produced when the machine's underlying Microsoft Windows software is reset.  The test tickets would drop into the collection tray at the bottom of the machine.

External links

Online screen interface demonstration for Southern Railway customers *
List of known Worldline FASTticket positions as of 2006
Worldline FASTticket product information page
Article in Rail Professional, March 2006; note that the sentence "Chiltern Railways, another Shere customer, opted for SMART" should read "...opted for FAST"

Fare collection systems in the United Kingdom
Public transport information systems
Science and technology in Surrey
Travel technology